Gerhard Moehring (28 March 1921 – 29 January 2023) was a German teacher and local historian.

In 2020, Moehring was awarded the Lisa Rees Medal for his life’s work.

Moehring died on 29 January 2023, at the age of 101.

Selected publications 
 1991ː Lörrach in alten Ansichten
 2001ː Chronik Lörrach-Hauingen
 2001ː 1250 Jahre Röttler Kirche, Band 1/2001 der Zeitschrift Das Markgräflerland herausgegeben vom Geschichtsverein Markgräflerland, Schopfheim, ISBN 3-932738-17-9 Digitalisat der UB Freiburg
 2006ː Kleine Geschichte der Stadt Lörrach, G. Braun, Karlsruhe, ISBN 978-3-7650-8347-1 (2. Auflage: Der Kleine Buch Verlag, Karlsruhe, 2016, ISBN 978-3-7650-1422-2)
 2007ː Geschichte der Juden in Lörrach, G. Braun, Leinfelden-Echterdingen, ISBN 978-3-7650-8347-1

References

1921 births
2023 deaths
German educators
German historians
German centenarians
Men centenarians
People from Lörrach